Averill is an unincorporated community in Clay County, in the U.S. state of Minnesota.

History
A post office was established at Averill in 1899, and remained in operation until being discontinued in 1969. The community was named for John T. Averill, an officer in the Civil War and Minnesota legislator.

References

Unincorporated communities in Clay County, Minnesota
Unincorporated communities in Minnesota